Exsudoporus is a genus of fungi in the family Boletaceae.  It was  circumscribed in 2014 by Alfredo Vizzini and colleagues, following a number of molecular studies that outlined a new phylogenetic framework for Boletaceae and revealed the genus Boletus in its traditional circumscription to be polyphyletic. However, due to lack of sufficient sequences, Wu and colleagues (2016) were reluctant to accept the newly proposed genus and considered it a synonym of Butyriboletus. Following additional phylogenetic sequencing and morphological analyses, Exsudoporus was clearly resolved as a monophyletic, homogenous and independent genus that is sister to Butyriboletus.  

Species of Exsudoporus are united by the tendency of their pores to exude yellowish droplets, hence the generic epithet. Other distinctive features separating Exsudoporus from its sister-genus Butyriboletus, include the reddish-orange colour of their pores and the distinctly elongated, often 'sculpted' (raised) reticulation on the stipe.

The genus currently accommodates four species, of which Exsudoporus permagnificus is native to Europe and West Asia, Exsudoporus ruber is native to East Asia, and two other species, Exsudoporus floridanus and Exsudoporus frostii, are native to North America.

References

External links

Boletaceae
Boletales genera